Nikki Teasley (born March 22, 1979) is a former basketball player in the WNBA.

Born in Washington, D.C., she played college basketball at the University of North Carolina at Chapel Hill.

In the 2002 WNBA Draft, Teasley was selected as the #5 overall pick by the Portland Fire.  But shortly afterwards, she was traded with Sophia Witherspoon to the Los Angeles Sparks for Ukari Figgs and second-round pick Gergana Slavtcheva.

Teasley helped the Sparks win their second consecutive title by hitting a series-winning three-pointer in the final seconds.

On March 24, 2008, Teasley was waived by the Washington Mystics.

The Atlanta Dream signed Teasley in 2008 and she suited up for the 2009 season. Teasley was then waived for Ivory Latta.

North Carolina statistics
Source

References

External links
WNBA Player Profile
WNBA 2002 Draft one-on-one chat interview
Teasley/Mystics part ways

1979 births
Living people
American expatriate basketball people in Turkey
American women's basketball players
Atlanta Dream players
Basketball players from Washington, D.C.
Detroit Shock players
Galatasaray S.K. (women's basketball) players
Los Angeles Sparks players
North Carolina Tar Heels women's basketball players
Parade High School All-Americans (girls' basketball)
Point guards
Washington Mystics players
Women's National Basketball Association All-Stars
Saint John's Catholic Prep (Maryland) alumni